Kim Seong-kyung (Hangul: 김성경), better known by his stage name Boi B (Hangul: 보이비), is a South Korean rapper and member of Rhythm Power. He was a contestant on Show Me the Money 5. He released his first album, Night Vibe, on April 25, 2017.

Discography

Extended plays

Singles

Filmography

Variety show

References

Living people
South Korean male rappers
South Korean hip hop singers
21st-century South Korean male  singers
Year of birth missing (living people)